Egypt competed in the 2003 All-Africa Games held at the National Stadium in the city of Abuja, Nigeria. The team came second overall with a total of 218 medals.

Competitors
Egypt entered 149 events at the games. Of these, 115 were for men and 34 for women.

Medal summary
Egypt won 218 medals, of which 81 were gold, 66 silver and 71 bronze, beaten only by the host, Nigeria.

Medal table

References

2003 in Egyptian sport
2003
Nations at the 2003 All-Africa Games